This is a list of lighthouses in Brunei.

Lighthouses

See also
 Lists of lighthouses and lightvessels

References

External links
 

Brunei
Lighthouses
Lighthouses
Towers in Brunei